Akadi is a Black-owned, West African restaurant in Portland, Oregon. Fatou Ouattara is the chef and owner.

Description
The menu specializes in cuisine from Burkina Faso and the Ivory Coast, and has seafood and vegetarian options. Options include fried plantains, plantain fufu, and stews.

History
Akadi originally operated at 3601 Northeast Martin Luther King Jr. Boulevard in the Boise neighborhood. During the COVID-19 pandemic, business had declined by 50 percent, as of July 2020. In December 2020, Ouattara confirmed plans to close temporarily on December 31. Akadi reopened in southeast Portland's Hosford-Abernethy neighborhood in May 2022, along with its sister business, House of Flavor.

Reception
In 2018, Akadi was named one of Portland’s Best New Restaurants by Portland Monthly.

In 2019, Michael Russell included Akadi in The Oregonian list of the city's 10 best new restaurants.

In 2020, Eater Portland Brooke Jackson-Glidden said the Attieke Poisson Braisé was "one of the top dishes in Northeast Portland" and also recommended the goat pepper soup and mafe. The website's Waz Wu included Akadi in a 2023 list of "Portland’s Primo Special Occasion Restaurants for Vegans and Vegetarians".

See also 

 List of African restaurants

List of Black-owned restaurants

References

External links

 
 
 Akadi PDX at Lonely Planet

African culture in Oregon
African restaurants
Black-owned restaurants in the United States
Boise, Portland, Oregon
Hosford-Abernethy, Portland, Oregon
Northeast Portland, Oregon
Restaurants in Portland, Oregon
West African cuisine